Don't Come Knocking is a 2005 American Western film directed by German director Wim Wenders and written by Wenders and actor/playwright Sam Shepard. The two had previously collaborated on the film Paris, Texas (1984). It was entered into the 2005 Cannes Film Festival.

Plot
Shepard stars as Howard Spence, an aging, hard-living Western movie star, who, disgusted with his life & washed up, flees by horse from the set of his latest western filming in the desert outside Moab, Utah. He hits the road looking for refuge in his past, traveling to his hometown of Elko, Nevada to visit his mother, who he hasn't seen in 30 years. And, eventually, to Butte, Montana, looking for a woman (Jessica Lange) he left behind twenty years before when he was filming a movie there. Also converging on Butte is a young woman named Sky (Sarah Polley), returning her late mother's ashes to her hometown and conducting a search of her own.
Spence is doggedly pursued by Mr. Sutter (Tim Roth), a humorless representative of the company insuring Spence's latest film, whose mission is to return Spence to the set to finish filming the movie.

Cast
Sam Shepard as Howard Spence
Jessica Lange as Doreen
Tim Roth as Sutter
Gabriel Mann as Earl
Sarah Polley as Sky
Fairuza Balk as Amber
Eva Marie Saint as Howard's Mother
James Gammon as Old Ranch Hand
Marley Shelton as the starlet
Kurt Fuller as Mr. Daily

Actors and cameos
The film features cameo appearances by George Kennedy as a beleaguered movie director, and Tim Matheson and Julia Sweeney as movie producers. Also appearing briefly is Tom Farrell (from Wenders 1980 Lightning Over Water and the Screaming Man from Paris, Texas) as a high-school acquaintance who recognizes Howard along the way. The film also marks the first collaboration in 18 years (since 1988's Far North) between Shepard and his longtime partner Jessica Lange, as the two had an agreement never to work at the same time, in order not to neglect their children. Lange, Saint and Kennedy are all winners of Academy Awards.

Photography
The film was shot in 35mm anamorphic format by Franz Lustig using Hawk lenses. He and Wenders emphasized the influence of painter Edward Hopper on the cinematography.

Music

Most of the soundtrack was composed by T Bone Burnett and performed by Cassandra Wilson on vocals, Carla Azar on drums, Jay Bellerose on drums, Stephen Bruton on manaicello, Daphne Chen on violin, Keefus Ciancia on keyboards, Armando Compean on bass, Dennis Crouch on bass, Tony Gilkyson on guitar, Leah Katz on viola, Emile Kelman on cello, Jim Keltner on drums, Marc Ribot on guitar and Patrick Warren who also composed additional music on keyboards and pump organ.

The title song "Don't Come Knocking" was performed by Andrea Corr & Bono.

References

External links
Official site

MUBI

2005 films
2005 drama films
2005 Western (genre) films
2000s drama road movies
2000s English-language films
American drama road movies
American Western (genre) films
Elko, Nevada
English-language German films
Films directed by Wim Wenders
Films scored by T Bone Burnett
Films set in Montana
Films set in Nevada
Films set in Utah
Films shot in Montana
Films with screenplays by Sam Shepard
Neo-Western films
Sony Pictures Classics films
2000s American films